Park Jeong-hun or Pak Jŏng-hun (박정훈) may refer to:
 Pak Jong-hun (born 1948), North Korean footballer
 Park Jeong-hun, South Korean League of Legends player also known as "kfo"
 Park Jung-hoon (cinematographer) (born 1982), South Korean cinematographer and film director
 Park Jung-hoon (footballer) (born 1988), South Korean football player